Egyptian Theatre may refer to:

Grauman's Egyptian Theatre (Hollywood, California)
Egyptian Theatre (Boise, Idaho)
Egyptian Theatre (Coos Bay, Oregon)
Egyptian Theatre (DeKalb, Illinois)
Egyptian Theatre (Delta, Colorado)
Mary G. Steiner Egyptian Theatre (Park City, Utah)
Peery's Egyptian Theater (Ogden, Utah)